Douglas Turnbull may refer to:

 Doug Turnbull, (1904 – 1996) American lacrosse player
 Douglass Turnbull,  Professor of Neurology at Newcastle University

See also
 Douglas Trumbull, (born 1942) American film director
 Alexander Douglas Turnbull  (1903 - 1993) Canadian engineer